SDLA may refer to:
Sindhudesh Liberation Army, a Pakistani group labelled a terrorist organisation
Social Democratic League of America, a former American political party
South Dakota Library Association, professional association for librarians in South Dakota